M. Brinton Lykes (born 1949) is an American psychologist who has established a reputation for her work on psychosocial effects of state-sponsored terror and organized violence.

Life
Lykes originally hailed from New Orleans. She obtained her first BA degree from Hollins University before proceeding to Harvard University where she obtained an M.Div. in Applied Theology.  She obtained a Ph.D. in Community Psychology from Boston College.

Lykes has worked at Boston College since 1992 where she was promoted from assistant professor to full professor in the Lynch School of Education.  She has held various posts including department chair and Associate Dean.

Work
Lykes work has focused on understanding the impact of state-sponsored violence and terror.  She has worked mostly in Central America, in particular with the Maya peoples of Guatemala. She has used participatory action research and oral history as her primary research methods. She is the co-founder of the Martín-Baró Fund for Mental Health and Human Rights.

She is the co-editor of the International Journal of Transitional Justice.

Awards
Lykes has received a variety of awards for her work including the APA International Humanitarian Award of the American Psychological Association and the Ignacio Martín-Baró Lifetime Peace Practitioner Award of the APA Society for the Study of Peace, Conflict and Violence.

Publications
 Lykes, M. B. & Sibley, E. (2014). Liberation psychology and pragmatic solidarity: North-South collaborations through the Ignacio Martín-Baró Fund. Peace and Conflict: Journal of Peace Psychology, 20(3), 209–226. 
 Lykes, M.B. (2014). Maya Women of Chajul. In Coghlan, D. & Brydon-Miller, M. (Eds). The SAGE encyclopedia of action research. (Vols. 1–2) (pp. 529–532) . Thousand Oaks, CA: SAGE.
 Lykes, M.B. (2014). Ignacio Martín-Baró. In Coghlan, D. & Brydon-Miller, M. (Eds). The SAGE encyclopedia of action research. (Vols. 1–2) (pp. 523–526). Thousand Oaks, CA: SAGE

References

21st-century American psychologists
Boston College faculty
Fellows of the American Psychological Association
Harvard Divinity School alumni
Living people
Boston College alumni
1949 births
Hollins University alumni
Peace psychologists
20th-century American psychologists